Cornelius Robinson (September 25, 1805 – July 29, 1867) was a politician from Alabama who served in the Provisional Confederate Congress at the beginning of the American Civil War.

Robinson was born in Wadesboro, North Carolina. He was the sixth of eight children of Tod and Martha Ann (Terry) Robinson of Anson County. He later moved to Alabama, and in 1836 was the captain of a company of infantry.

Following the resignation of Alabama delegate John Gill Shorter in November 1861, Robinson was elected to fill the vacancy. He took his seat on April 29, 1861. He subsequently resigned from the Congress on January 24, 1862. His son Cornelius Robinson, Jr. served as an officer in the 46th Alabama Infantry during the war.

Robinson died on his plantation near Benton, Alabama, and was buried there at Mt. Gilead Cemetery.

His great-niece, Ednah Robinson Aiken (1872-1960), was a San Francisco-based novelist and clubwoman.

References
 Beers, Henry Putney, The Confederacy: A Guide to the Archives of the Government of the Confederate States of America. Washington, D.C.: United States National Archives and Records Administration, 1986.
 Current, Richard N., Encyclopedia of the Confederacy. New York: Simon & Schuster, 1993. .
 Journal of the Congress of the Confederate States of America, 1861-1865. Washington, D.C.: United States War Department, Government Printing Office, 1905.

Notes

1805 births
1867 deaths
People from Wadesboro, North Carolina
Deputies and delegates to the Provisional Congress of the Confederate States
19th-century American politicians
Alabama lawyers
People of Alabama in the American Civil War
People from Benton, Alabama
19th-century American lawyers